USS Elk is a name used more than once by the U.S. Navy:

 , a Civil War gunboat commissioned 6 May 1864.
 ,  a tanker, was launched 6 November 1943 by California Shipbuilding Corp., Wilmington, California.

United States Navy ship names